Cancer/testis antigen family 45, member A5 is a protein in humans that is encoded by the CT45A5 gene.

This gene represents one of a cluster of six similar genes located on the q arm of chromosome X. The genes in this cluster encode members of the cancer/testis (CT) family of antigens, and are distinct from other CT antigens. These antigens are thought to be novel therapeutic targets for human cancers. Alternative splicing results in multiple transcript variants. A related pseudogene has been identified on chromosome 5. [provided by RefSeq, May 2010].

References

Further reading 

Proteins